Carlos Nahuel Speck (born 16 May 1997) is an Argentine professional footballer who plays as a left midfielder for Güemes.

Career
Speck began his career in the youth system of Gimnasia y Esgrima. He departed the club in June 2018, after agreeing to sign for Primera B Nacional's Atlético de Rafaela. Having been an unused substitute in the Copa Argentina against Lanús on 22 August, Speck made his senior debut on 1 September by coming on as a substitute for Lucas Quiroz during a 1–1 draw with Sarmiento.

Career statistics
.

References

External links

1997 births
Living people
People from Termas de Río Hondo
Argentine footballers
Association football midfielders
Primera Nacional players
Torneo Argentino B players
Club de Gimnasia y Esgrima La Plata footballers
Atlético de Rafaela footballers
Libertad de Sunchales footballers
9 de Julio de Rafaela players
Unión de Sunchales footballers
Sportivo Las Parejas footballers
Sportspeople from Santiago del Estero Province